The Tian Shan, also known as the Tengri Tagh or Tengir-Too, meaning the Mountains of Heaven or the Heavenly Mountain, is a large system of mountain ranges in Central Asia.

One of the earliest historical references to these mountains may be related to the Xiongnu word Qilian – according to Tang commentator Yan Shigu, Qilian is the Xiongnu word for sky or heaven. Sima Qian in the Records of the Grand Historian mentioned Qilian in relation to the homeland of the Yuezhi and the term is believed to refer to the Tian Shan rather than the Qilian Mountains  further east now known by this name. The Tannu-Ola mountains in Tuva has the same meaning in its name ("heaven/celestial mountains" or "god/spirit mountains"). The name in Chinese, Tian Shan, is most likely a direct translation of the traditional Kyrgyz name for the mountains, Teñir Too. The Tian Shan is sacred in Tengrism, and its second-highest peak is known as Khan Tengri which may be translated as "Lord of the Spirits". At the 2013 Conference on World Heritage, the eastern portion of Tian Shan in western China's Xinjiang Region was listed as a World Heritage Site. The western portion in Kazakhstan, Kyrgyzstan, and Uzbekistan was then listed in 2016.

Geography 
Tian Shan is north and west of the Taklamakan Desert and directly north of the Tarim Basin in the border region of Kazakhstan, Kyrgyzstan, Uzbekistan and Xinjiang in Northwest China. In the south it links up with the Pamir Mountains and to north and east it meets the Altai Mountains of Mongolia.

In Western cartography as noted by the National Geographic Society, the eastern end of the Tian Shan is usually understood to be east of Ürümqi, with the range to the east of that city known as the Bogda Shan as part of the Tian Shan. Chinese cartography from the Han Dynasty to the present agrees, with the Tian Shan including the Bogda Shan and Barkol ranges.

The Tian Shan are a part of the Himalayan orogenic belt, which was formed by the collision of the Indian and Eurasian plates in the Cenozoic era. They are one of the longest mountain ranges in Central Asia and stretch some  eastward from Tashkent in Uzbekistan.

The highest peak in the Tian Shan is Jengish Chokusu (also called Victory Peak) on the Kyrgyzstan-China border.

The forested Alatau ranges, which are at a lower altitude in the northern part of the Tian Shan, are inhabited by Turkic-speaking pastoral tribes.

The Tian Shan are separated from the Tibetan Plateau by the Taklimakan Desert and the Tarim Basin to the south. The major rivers rising in the Tian Shan are the Syr Darya, the Ili River and the Tarim River. The Aksu Canyon is a notable feature in the northwestern Tian Shan.

Continuous permafrost is typically found in the Tian Shan starting at the elevation of about 3,500-3,700 m above sea level. Discontinuous alpine permafrost usually occurs down to 2,700-3,300 m, but in certain locations, due to the peculiarity of the aspect and the microclimate, it can be found at elevations as low as 2,000 m.

Glaciers in the Tian Shan Mountains have been rapidly shrinking and have lost 27%, or 5.4 billion tons annually, of its ice mass since 1961 compared to an average of 7% worldwide. It is estimated that by 2050, half of the remaining glaciers will have melted.

One of the first Europeans to visit and the first to describe the Tian Shan in detail was the Russian explorer Peter Semenov, who did so in the 1850s.

Ranges
The Tian Shan have a number of named ranges which are often mentioned separately (all distances are approximate).

Then there is a low area between Ürümqi and the Turfan Depression. The Borohoro Mountains start just south of Ürümqi and run west-northwest  separating Dzungaria from the Ili River basin. Their north end abuts on the  Dzungarian Alatau which runs east northeast along Sino-Kazakh border. The Dzungarian Alatau in the north, the Borohoro Mountains in the middle and the Ketmen Ridge in the south make a reversed Z or S, the northeast enclosing part of Dzungaria and the southwest enclosing the upper Ili valley.

In Kyrgyzstan the mainline of the Tian Shan continues as Narat Range from the base of the Borohoros west  to the point where China, Kazakhstan, and Kyrgyzstan meet.  Here is the highest part of the range – the Central Tian Shan, with Peak Pobeda (Kakshaal Too range) and Khan Tengri. West of this, the Tian Shan split into an 'eye', with Issyk Kul Lake in its center.  The south side of the lake is the Terskey Alatau and the north side the Kyungey Ala-Too (shady and sunny Ala-Too).  North of the Kyungey Ala-Too and parallel to it is the Trans-Ili Alatau in Kazakhstan just south of Almaty. West of the eye, the range continues  as the Kyrgyz Ala-Too, separating Chüy Region from Naryn Region and then Kazakhstan from the upper valley of the river Talas, the south side of which is the  Talas Ala-Too Range ('Ala-too' is a Kyrgyz spelling of Alatau). At the east end of the Talas Alatau the Suusamyr Too range runs southeast enclosing the Suusamyr Valley or plateau.

As for the area south of the Fergana Valley there is an  group of mountains that curves west-southwest from south of Issyk Kul Lake separating the Tarim Basin from the Fergana Valley. The Fergana Range runs northeast towards the Talas Ala-Too and separates the upper Naryn basin from Fergana proper. The southern side of these mountains merge into the Pamirs in Tajikistan (Alay Mountains and Trans-Alay Range). West of this is the Turkestan Range, which continues almost to Samarkand.

Ice Age
This mountain chain as well as that of the 300 km long parallel mountain chain of the Terskey Alatau and the Tian Shan plateau situated in between, during glacial times were covered by connected ice-stream-networks and a plateau glacier. Currently, the interglacial remnant of this glaciation is formed by the only just 61 km long South Inylschek glacier. The outlet glacier tongues of the plateau glacier flowed to the north as far as down to Lake Issyk Kul (Lake) at 1605 (1609) m asl calving in this 160 km long lake.

In the same way, strong glaciation was in excess of 50  km wide in the high mountain area of the Kungey Alatau, connecting north of Issyk Kul and stretching as far as the mountain foreland near Alma Ata. The Kungey Alatau is 230  km long. Down from the Kungey Alatau the glacial glaciers also calved into the Issyk Kul lake. The Chon-Kemin valley was glaciated up to its inflow into the Chu valley. From the west-elongation of the Kungey Alatau—that is the Kirgizskiy Alatau range (42°25′N/74–75°E)—the glacial glaciers flowed down as far as into the mountain foreland down to 900 m asl (close to the town Bishkek). Among others the Ak-Sai valley glacier has developed there a mountain foreland glacier.

Altogether the glacial Tian Shan glaciation occupied an area of c. . The glacier snowline (ELA) between the glacier feeding area and melting zone was about 1200m lower during the last ice age than it is today.
Under the condition of a comparable precipitation ratio, there would result from this a depression of the average annual temperature of 7.2 to 8.4 °C for the Last Glacial Maximum compared with today.

Ecology
 

The Tian Shan in its immediate geological past was kept from glaciation due to the "protecting" warm influence of the Indian Ocean monsoon climate. This defined its ecological features which could sustain its distinctive ecosphere. The mountains were subjected to constant geological changes with constantly evolving drainage systems which affected the patterns of vegetation, as well as exposing fertile soil for newly emerging seedlings to thrive in.

Tulips originated in Tian Shan Mountains. The plant then made its way to Turkey via the Silk Road and became a symbol of the Ottoman Empire.

Ancestors of important crop vegetation were established and thrived in the area, among them: apricots (Prunus armeniaca), pears (Pyrus spp.), pomegranates (Punica granatum), figs (Ficus), cherries (Prunus avium) and mulberries (Morus). The Tian Shan region also included important animals like bear, deer and wild boar, which helped to spread seeds and expand the ecological diversity.

Among the vegetation colonizing the Tian Shan came, likely via birds from the east, the ancestors of what we know as the "sweet" apple. The fruit
probably then looked like a tiny, long-stalked, bitter apple something like Malus baccata, the Siberian crab. The pips may have been carried in a bird's crop or clotted onto feet or feathers.

Climate

Tian Shan has a alpine climate (Köppen climate classification ETH).

Religion

Tengrism
In Tengrism, Khan Tengri is the lord of all spirits and the religion's supreme deity, and it is the name given to the second highest peak of Tian Shan.

See also

Tectonics of the Tian Shan
Pyotr Semyonov-Tyan-Shansky

Notes

References

Citations

Sources 

 The Contemporary Atlas of China. 1988. London: Marshall Editions Ltd. Reprint 1989. Sydney, NSW: Collins Publishers Australia.
 The Times Comprehensive Atlas of the World. Eleventh Edition. 2003. London, England: Times Books Group Ltd.

External links

Russian mountaineering site
Tien Shan
 
United Nations University (2009) digital video "Finding a place to feed: Kyrgyz shepherds & pasture loss": Shepherd shares family's observations and adaptation to the changing climate in highland pastures of Kyrgyzstan's Tian Shan mountains Accessed 1 December 2009

 
Mountain ranges of Kazakhstan
Mountain ranges of Kyrgyzstan
Mountain ranges of Xinjiang
Geography of Central Asia
Geography of East Asia
Sites along the Silk Road
World Heritage Sites in China